Hillsboro Parish was created as a civil parish in Queens County, Prince Edward Island, Canada, during the 1764–1766 survey of Samuel Holland.

It contains the following townships:

 Lot 29
 Lot 30
 Lot 31
 Lot 65

Parishes of Prince Edward Island
Geography of Queens County, Prince Edward Island